Alan Loras (born July 4, 1986) is a Bolivian football defender who plays for Club Atlético Palmaflor in the Liga de Fútbol Profesional Boliviano.

References
 
 

1986 births
Living people
People from Trinidad, Bolivia
Association football defenders
Bolivian footballers
Municipal Real Mamoré players
Club San José players
Universitario de Sucre footballers
Club Blooming players
C.D. Palmaflor del Trópico players